Tracks is the first compilation album by Italian singer-songwriter Vasco Rossi, released by EMI Records on 22 November 2002. 
Tracks was released as a double album featuring 24 songs, including hits released by Vasco Rossi at the beginning of his career, such as "Splendida giornata", as well as more recent singles.
It was preceded by the single "Generale", a previously unreleased live cover of the song originally written and recorded by Francesco De Gregori. The single was recorded live on 7 July 1995 at the San Siro stadium in Milan.

The album was the best-selling record of 2002 in Italy. According to EMI Record, it had sold more than 650,000 units by the end of the year, despite being released in late November.
Tracks also received a nomination for Best Italian Album at the Italian Music Awards 2003.

Track listing
Disc 1

Disc 2

Charts

Weekly charts

Year-end charts

Certifications

References

2002 compilation albums
EMI Records compilation albums
Vasco Rossi albums
Italian-language albums